Gasparia is a genus of South Pacific araneomorph spiders in the family Toxopidae, and was first described by Brian J. Marples in 1956. Originally placed with the intertidal spiders, it was moved to the Toxopidae in 2017.

Species
 it contains twenty-two species, all found in New Zealand:
Gasparia busa Forster, 1970 – New Zealand
Gasparia coriacea Forster, 1970 – New Zealand
Gasparia delli (Forster, 1955) – New Zealand (Antipodes Is., Auckland Is., Campbell Is.)
Gasparia dentata Forster, 1970 – New Zealand
Gasparia edwardsi Forster, 1970 – New Zealand
Gasparia kaiangaroa Forster, 1970 – New Zealand (Chatham Is.)
Gasparia littoralis Forster, 1970 – New Zealand
Gasparia lomasi Forster, 1970 – New Zealand
Gasparia mangamuka Forster, 1970 – New Zealand
Gasparia manneringi (Forster, 1964) – New Zealand (Snares Is.)
Gasparia montana Forster, 1970 – New Zealand
Gasparia nava Forster, 1970 – New Zealand
Gasparia nebulosa Marples, 1956 (type) – New Zealand
Gasparia nelsonensis Forster, 1970 – New Zealand
Gasparia nuntia Forster, 1970 – New Zealand
Gasparia oparara Forster, 1970 – New Zealand
Gasparia parva Forster, 1970 – New Zealand
Gasparia pluta Forster, 1970 – New Zealand
Gasparia rupicola Forster, 1970 – New Zealand
Gasparia rustica Forster, 1970 – New Zealand
Gasparia tepakia Forster, 1970 – New Zealand
Gasparia tuaiensis Forster, 1970 – New Zealand

References

Araneomorphae genera
Spiders of New Zealand
Spiders of Oceania
Toxopidae
Taxa named by Brian John Marples